Oguchigawa Dam is a gravity dam located in Toyama prefecture in Japan. The dam is used for power production. The catchment area of the dam is 251.1 km2. The dam impounds about 11  ha of land when full and can store 2718 thousand cubic meters of water. The construction of the dam was started on 1977 and completed in 1981.

References

Dams in Toyama Prefecture
1981 establishments in Japan